Georgi Khristov (born 14 October 1947) is a former Bulgarian basketball player. He competed in the men's tournament at the 1968 Summer Olympics.

References

External links
 

1947 births
Living people
Bulgarian men's basketball players
Olympic basketball players of Bulgaria
Basketball players at the 1968 Summer Olympics
People from Botevgrad
Sportspeople from Sofia Province